The individual large hill/10 km competition in Nordic combined at the 2022 Winter Olympics was held on 15 February, at the Kuyangshu Nordic Center and Biathlon Center in Zhangjiakou. Jørgen Graabak of Norway won the gold medal, replicating his 2014 success. Jens Lurås Oftebro, also of Norway, became the silver medalist, his first Olympic medal. Akito Watabe of Japan won bronze.

Johannes Rydzek is the defending champion. The 2018 silver medalist, Fabian Rießle, did not qualify for the Olympics, but the bronze medalist, Eric Frenzel, did. Johannes Lamparter was the overall leader of the 2021–22 FIS Nordic Combined World Cup before the Olympics, followed by Jarl Magnus Riiber and Vinzenz Geiger. Lamparter is also the 2021 World Champion in individual large hill/10 km.

Qualification

Results

Ski jumping
The ski jumping part was held at 16:00.

Cross-country
The cross-country part was held at 18:30.

References

Nordic combined at the 2022 Winter Olympics